The 306th Fighter Wing (306th FW) was a World War II United States Army Air Forces organization assigned to Fifteenth Air Force as an intermediate-level command and control organization. It was last stationed at Drew Field, Florida and was inactivated on 7 November 1945.

History

World War II
The first predecessor of the 356th Special Operations Wing was the 306th Fighter Wing of World War II.

Constituted originally as the 306th Bombardment Wing (Heavy) on 7 December 1943. Activated in Italy on 15 January 1944. Assigned to Fifteenth Air Force.

Entered combat in Mar as a fighter organization. Redesignated 306th Fighter Wing in May 1944. Operated in the Mediterranean and European theaters until the end of the war.

Moved to the US, July–August 1945. Inactivated on 7 November 1945.

Vietnam War
The second predecessor of the wing was the 656th Special Operations Wing, which replaced the 56th Special Operations Wing in Thailand in 1975.

Consolidation and redesignation
The two wings were consolidated as the 356th Special Operations Wing in 1985, but have not been active since.

Lineage
 306th Fighter Wing
 Constituted as the 306th Bombardment Wing (Heavy) on 7 December 1943
 Activated on 15 January 1944.
 Redesignated 306th Fighter Wing in May 1944
 Inactivated on 7 November 1945
 Consolidated with the 656th Special Operations Wing as the 356th Special Operations Wing on 31 July 1985

 656th Special Operations Wing
 Established as the 656th Special Operations Wing on 14 May 1975 (not organized)
 Activated on 30 June 1975
 Inactivated on 22 September 1975.
 Consolidated with the 306th Fighter Wing as the 356th Special Operations Wing on 31 July 1985

Assignments
 Fifteenth Air Force, 15 January 1944 – 15 July 1945
 Third Air Force, August − 7 November 1945
 Thirteenth Air Force, 30 June 1975
 17th Air Division, 1 July – 22 September 1975

Stations
 Bari Airfield, Italy, 15 January 1944
 Foggia Airfield, Italy, 27 January 1944
 Lucera Airfield, Italy, 23 February 1944
 Torremaggiore, Italy, 8 March 1944
 Lesina Airfield, Italy, 3 September 1944
 Fano Airfield, Italy, 5 March – 15 July 1945
 Drew Field, Florida, August −7 November 1945
 Nakhon Phanom Airport, Thailand, 30 June – 22 September 1975

Components
 Groups
 1st Fighter Group, 27 March – November 1944
 14th Fighter Group, 1 November 1943 – 27 March 1944
 31st Fighter Group, 2 April 1944 – 13 June 1945
 52d Fighter Group, 14 May 1944 – 13 June 1945
 82d Fighter Group, 27 March 1944 – 13 June 1945
 325th Fighter Group, December 1943 – 13 June 1945
 332d Fighter Group, 28 May 1944 – 13 June 1945

 Squadrons
 21st Special Operations Squadron, attached 30 June – 22 September 1975
 23rd Flying Training Squadron, attached 30 June – 22 September 1975

Aircraft
 P-47 Thunderbolt, 1943–1944
 P-51 Mustang, 1944–1945
 Sikorsky CH-53, 1975
 North American OV-10 Bronco, 1975

References
 Notes

Bibliography

 
 

European theatre of World War II
Conflicts in 1945
Fighter wings of the United States Army Air Forces